Lars-Erik Larsson may refer to
Lars-Erik Larsson (1908–1986), Swedish composer
Lars-Erik Larsson (rower) (born 1937), Swedish rower
Lars-Erik Larsson (fencer) (born 1944), Swedish fencer